The Trionychinae are a subfamily of turtles in the family Trionychidae.

Classification 
The subfamily has 11 extant genera:
Amyda
Apalone
Axestemys 
Chitra
Dogania
Drazinderetes
Gobiapalone 
Khunnuchelys 
Murgonemys 
Nilssonia
Oliveremys 
Palea
Palaeoamyda
Pelochelys
Pelodiscus
Rafetoides (nomen dubium)
Rafetus
Trionyx

References

 
Reptile subfamilies
Taxa named by John Edward Gray